The 1946 Virginia Cavaliers football team was an American football team that represented the University of Virginia as an independent during the 1946 college football season. In their first year under head coach Art Guepe, the Cavaliers compiled a 4–4–1 record and outscored opponents by a total of 180 to 170. They played their home games at Scott Stadium in Charlottesville, Virginia.

Schedule

After the season

The 1947 NFL Draft was held on December 16, 1946. The following Cavalier was selected.

References

Virginia
Virginia Cavaliers football seasons
Virginia Cavaliers football